Mihály Matura (9 April 1900 – 7 August 1975) was a Hungarian wrestler. He competed in the Greco-Roman lightweight event at the 1924 Summer Olympics.

References

External links
 

1900 births
1975 deaths
Olympic wrestlers of Hungary
Wrestlers at the 1924 Summer Olympics
Hungarian male sport wrestlers
Sport wrestlers from Budapest
20th-century Hungarian people